PSGC stands for Persatuan Sepak Bola Galuh Ciamis (en: Football Association of Galuh Ciamis). PSGC Ciamis is an Indonesian football club based in Ciamis Regency, West Java. They currently play in Liga 3. PSGC's most common nicknames are Ayam Sentul (The Sentul Roosters) and Laskar Singacala (Singacala Warriors).

History
PSGC Ciamis was established in 1990, starting on August 26, 1990, in the 1990 Galuh Cup final. PSGC A (Ciamis) managed to beat Tasikmalaya 3-0 at Galuh Field, Ciamis Regency. PSGC A won the 1990 Galuh Cup title. 1990 Galuh Cup was attended by six teams from five regions. They came from West Java (Tasikmalaya, Majalengka, Kuningan, and the host Ciamis) and Cilacap from Central Java. The hosts included two of their teams, PSGC A and PSGC B. During the Dutch East Indies era, Ciamis Regency introduced the name Persig (Persatuan Sepakbola Indonesia Galuh). after independence, the name was changed to Persigal (Persatuan Sepakbola Indonesia Galuh).

Times have changed, including people's lives. In 1990, Persigal changed its name to PSGC. The reason was, at that time there were those who suggested that Ciamis football should not use the name GALUH, because it was too burdensome. Finally, the name CIAMIS was attached to the name GALUH. Ciamis Regency is one of the areas that uses one of the "icon" for the name of the union. The icon is (the kingdom of) Galuh.

Stadium 
They play their home matches in Galuh Stadium, with the capacity of 10,000 spectators.

References

External links 
 
  PSGC on Liga Indonesia
 

Football clubs in Indonesia
Football clubs in West Java
Association football clubs established in 1990
1990 establishments in Indonesia